Adam Saul Pally (born March 18, 1982) is an American actor, comedian, writer, and producer. He is best known for starring as Max Blum in the ABC comedy series Happy Endings and as Dr. Peter Prentice in The Mindy Project. He also starred in the FOX comedy Making History and was the executive producer of The President Show.

Early life and education
Pally was born in New York City, to Dr. Steven Pally, an internist who owns his own medical office, and Caryn Pally, who managed the practice in Florham Park, New Jersey. He was raised Jewish. He grew up in New York City, Chicago, and New Jersey, and has two sisters, Erica and Risa.

In 2004, Pally graduated from The New School University in New York City. He has performed improv and sketch comedy at the Upright Citizens Brigade Theatre (UCBT) in New York since 2002 and continues to perform in shows such as "Death by Roo Roo" and "ASSSSCAT 3000" at the theater's Los Angeles division. He is a member of the sketch comedy group "Chubby Skinny Kids" with comedians Dan Gregor and Doug Mand. Pally is also part of the improv group "Hot Sauce" with Gil Ozeri and Ben Schwartz; the group continues to perform their long-form improv show at UCBT occasionally.

Career
Pally has appeared in such films as Iron Man 3, Taking Woodstock, Solitary Man, Assassination of a High School President, The To Do List and A.C.O.D. and Slow Learners. He has made guest appearances on Last Week Tonight with John Oliver, Californication and The Colbert Report. He has written and appeared on the Adult Swim series NTSF:SD:SUV::. In 2012, it was reported that Pally and frequent collaborator Gil Ozeri wrote a script being produced by Will Ferrell & Adam McKay's company Gary Sanchez Productions.

From April 2011 to May 2013, Pally starred as Max Blum, one of the lead characters on the ABC ensemble comedy series Happy Endings, alongside Eliza Coupe, Elisha Cuthbert, Zachary Knighton, Damon Wayans Jr., and Casey Wilson. In 2013, Pally was nominated for "Best Supporting Actor in a Comedy Series" at the Critics' Choice Television Awards for his work on season three of Happy Endings. The cast reunited in July 2020 for the pandemic-themed episode "And the Pandemmy goes to..." to raise money for the charities Color of Change and World Central Kitchen.

Following the cancellation of Happy Endings in 2013, Pally joined the cast of The Mindy Project as a series regular for the second and third seasons, playing the role of Dr. Peter Prentice. He left the show midway through the third season, making his final appearances as a series regular in 2015.

Pally filmed a lead role opposite T.J. Miller and Thomas Middleditch in the comedy Search Party. This film serves as the directorial debut of screenwriter Scot Armstrong. He also starred in the indie films Slow Learners and Night Owls, both released in 2015.

Media contributions and appearances
Pally is a regular contributor to the humor website Funny or Die, where he is best known for his series Riding Shotgun with Adam Pally, in which he interviews celebrities in his car. In 2009, he created for UCB Comedy a parody of the "David After Dentist" internet phenomenon; his is called "David After Divorce," and he speaks almost exactly the same lines as David, though to a different set of questions. It has received about 5 million hits on YouTube.
  
In 2011, Pally co-starred in the comedic stage-show The Realest Real Housewives, created by his Happy Endings co-star Casey Wilson.

Pally has appeared regularly on many podcasts on the Earwolf network such as Comedy Bang! Bang!, improv4humans, Who Charted, and How Did This Get Made?.

On June 5, 2015, Pally and fellow comedian friends Gil Ozeri and John Gemberling gained attention when they teamed with Funny or Die to live-stream their 50-hour marathon of Entourage, watching every episode in a row with no breaks for 50 hours straight.

Personal life
Pally lives in New York. He married Daniella Anne Pally (née Liben) on July 3, 2008; the couple have three children: a son Cole (b. 2012), daughter Georgia Grace (b. 2013), and another son, Drake (b. 2017). He was arrested for misdemeanor drug possesion in 2017.

Filmography

Film

Television

Web series

Awards and nominations

References

External links
 
 

1982 births
Living people
Male actors from New Jersey
American male comedians
American male film actors
American male television actors
American television writers
American male television writers
Jewish American male actors
Jewish American male comedians
The New School alumni
People from Livingston, New Jersey
21st-century American male actors
Upright Citizens Brigade Theater performers
Comedians from New Jersey
Screenwriters from New York (state)
Screenwriters from New Jersey
21st-century American comedians
21st-century American screenwriters
21st-century American male writers
21st-century American Jews